The Wolfman Jack Show was a Canadian variety television series which aired on CBC Television from 1976 to 1977, and syndicated to stations in the US.

Premise
This Vancouver-based series was a co-production of the CBC and host Wolfman Jack's production company, Howl Productions. International musical guests were combined with Canadian musicians such as Bachman–Turner Overdrive and The Stampeders. Other segments frequently featured comedy from Peter Cullen, Danny Wells and Sally Sales, with sketches from the Famous People Players.

This series was broadcast concurrently with Wolfman Jack's other music series, The Midnight Special on NBC, where he was an announcer and co-host.

Scheduling
This half-hour series was broadcast on CBC Television Tuesdays at 7:30 p.m. (Eastern) from 5 October 1976 until 13 September 1977.

References

External links
 
 

CBC Television original programming
1976 Canadian television series debuts
1977 Canadian television series endings
1970s Canadian music television series
Television shows filmed in Vancouver
1970s Canadian variety television series